The TTK Group is an Indian business conglomerate with a presence across several segments of industry including consumer durables, pharmaceuticals and supplements, bio-medical devices, maps and atlases, consular visa  services, virtual assistant services and health care services.

The TTK Group was started in 1928 by T. T. Krishnamachari, and is largely owned by the family. The group has revenues of over US$450 Million with a presence across India and several international markets. The group has joint ventures with global corporations such as SSL International and Dr. Scholl's foot care products. The group is also associated with several charitable and social organizations, such as the TTK Voluntary Blood Bank, the T.T. Ranganathan Clinical Research Foundation (a hospital for alcohol and drug addiction) and TTK Schools for the underprivileged.

TTK Protective Devices Limited (formerly TTK – LIG) also has its own brand of Condoms, which it has been marketing since 1950's, and started its first condom manufacturing plant in 1963. TTK Protective Devices Limited, which was merged with TTK Healthcare Ltd. and is now no longer a separate entity, but a division of the aforementioned company, now has a capacity of around two billion condoms per year.

History 
The TTK Group was founded in 1928 as an indenting agency by T.T. Krishnamachari. The current executive chairman of TTK Prestige T.T.Jagannathan along with Sandhya Mendonca has co-authored a book titled "Disrupt and Conquer - How TTK Prestige Became a Billion-Dollar Company". The book is a journey about the company's many milestones and how it had fought bankruptcy to become a successful company.

The company was the first to introduce organised distribution to India, and began life as a distribution agent for a wide range of products ranging from Foods, Personal care products, Writing instruments, to Ethical products.

World-renowned brands like Cadbury's, MaxFactor, Kiwi, Kraft, Sunlight, Lifebuoy, Lux, Ponds, Brylcreem, Kellogg's, Ovaltine, Horlicks, Mclean, Sheaffer's, Waterman's & much more were first brought to India by the TTK Group itself, before the Indian market was liberalised and these brands ventured into India by themselves.

Brands
The TTK Group has been associated with several brands in India, including:

 TTK Chitra Heart Valves
 TTK Buechel Pappas Knee Replacement systems
 Fryums
 Skore Condoms
 Prestige pressure cookers
 Woodward's gripe water
 Good Home 
 GetFriday
 Eva Deodorants
 CignaTTK Health Insurance (Joint Venture with CIGNA, USA)
 TTK Services Pvt LTD

See also
TTK Prestige
TTK Services

References

External links
 
 

Pharmaceutical companies established in 1928
Pharmaceutical companies of India
Health care companies of India
Home appliance manufacturers of India
Indian companies established in 1928
TTK Group